Podlužany may refer to several places in Slovakia.

Podlužany, Bánovce nad Bebravou District
Podlužany, Levice District